ROKS Yeosu (PCC-765) was a  of the Republic of Korea Navy and later transferred to Vietnam People's Navy as HQ-20.

Development and design 

The Pohang class is a series of corvettes built by different Korean shipbuilding companies. The class consists of 24 ships and some after decommissioning were sold or given to other countries. There are five different types of designs in the class from Flight II to Flight VI.

Construction and career 
Yeosu was launched on 14 June 1986 by DSME in Geoje. The vessel was commissioned on 1 December 1986 and decommissioned on 27 December 2017. She was transferred to the Vietnam People's Navy. She arrived on 17 October 2018 with a new name HQ-20.

During the South Korean International Fleet Review 2018 on 11 October 2018, HQ-20 sailed to South Korea with 13 other foreign country vessels.

References
 

Ships built by Daewoo Shipbuilding & Marine Engineering
Pohang-class corvettes
1986 ships
Corvettes of the Vietnam People's Navy